City Centre Mall is a five-storied shopping mall complex located at Sambalpur in the state of Odisha, India.

Background 
The mall is spread over a floor area of a hundred thousand square feet. It was publicly opened in 2012. The mall is developed and maintained by the Sambalpur Municipal Corporation.
It contains approximately fifty outlets, including cafeterias, food courts, restaurants, multiplex, parking space and a hypermarket.

See also 

 Sambalpur

References

Shopping malls in Odisha
Shopping malls established in 2012
2012 establishments in Odisha